The Sheikh Zayed Grand Mosque is located in Abu Dhabi, the capital city of the United Arab Emirates. The largest mosque in the country, it is the key place of worship for daily prayers. A smaller replica of the grand mosque exists in the Indonesian city of Surakarta.

History
The Grand Mosque was constructed between 1994 and 2007 and was inaugurated in December 2007. The main axis of the building is rotated about 12° south of true west, aligning it in the direction of the Kaaba in Mecca, Saudi Arabia. 

The project was launched by the late president of the United Arab Emirates (UAE), Sheikh Zayed bin Sultan Al Nahyan, who wanted to establish a structure that would unite the cultural diversity of the Islamic world with the historical and modern values of architecture and art. In 2004, Sheikh Zayed died and was buried in the courtyard of the mosque.

Sheikh Zayed Grand Mosque Center (SZGMC) offices are located in the west minarets. SZGMC manages the day-to-day operations and serves as a center of learning and discovery through its educational cultural activities and visitor programs. The library, located in the northeast minaret, serves the community with classic books and publications addressing a range of Islamic subjects: sciences, civilization, calligraphy, the arts, and coins, including some rare publications. The collection comprises material in a broad range of languages, including Arabic, English, French, Italian, Spanish, German, and Korean. For two years running, it was voted the world's second favourite landmark by TripAdvisor.

Design and construction
The mosque was built under the guidance and supervision of Sheikh Zayed bin Sultan Al Nahyan, the former president of the UAE, who was buried here after his death in 2004. 

The mosque's architect Yusef Abdelki took inspiration from a number of sources: the Abu al-Abbas al-Mursi Mosque in Alexandria, designed by Mario Rossi in the 1920s; the Badshahi Mosque in Lahore, Pakistan; and other references of Persian, Mughal, and Indo-Islamic architecture. The dome layout and floorplan of the mosque was inspired by the Badshahi Mosque. Its archways are quintessentially Moorish, and its minarets classically Arab.

In a joint-venture between Italian contractors Impregilo and Rizzani de Eccher, more than 3,000 workers and 38 sub-contracting companies were conscripted in its construction. The mosque was completed under a second contract by a Joint Venture between ACC and Six Construct (part of Belgian company BESIX Group) between 2004 and 2007. Natural materials were chosen for much of its design and construction due to their long-lasting qualities, including marble stone, gold, semi-precious stones, crystals and ceramics. Artisans and materials came from many countries including India, Italy, Germany, Egypt, Turkey, Morocco, Pakistan, Malaysia, Iran, China, United Kingdom, New Zealand, North Macedonia and the UAE.

Dimensions and statistics
The mosque is large enough to accommodate over 40,100 worshippers, while the main prayer hall can hold over 7,000. There are two smaller prayer halls, with a capacity of 1,500 each, one of which is the women's prayer hall.

Marble used in the construction included:
 Sivec from Prilep, North Macedonia was used on the external cladding ( of cladding has been used on the mosque, including the minarets)
 Lasa from Laas, South Tyrol, Italy was used in the internal elevations
 Makrana from Makrana, India was used in the annexes and offices
 Acquabianca and Bianco P from Italy
 East White and Ming Green from China

To compare, the King Faisal Mosque of Sharjah, formerly the largest mosque in Sharjah and country, measures .

Architectural features 
The carpet in the hall is considered by many  to be the world's largest carpet made by Iran's Carpet Company and designed by Iranian artist Ali Khaliqi. This carpet measures , and was made by around 1,200-1,300 carpet knotters. The weight of this carpet is 35 ton and is predominantly made from wool (originating from New Zealand and Iran). There are 2,268,000,000 knots within the carpet and it took approximately two years to complete.

The Sheikh Zayed Grand Mosque has seven imported chandeliers from the company Faustig in Munich, Germany that incorporate millions of Swarovski crystals. The largest chandelier is the second largest known chandelier inside a mosque, the third largest in the world, and has a  diameter and a  height.

The pools along the arcades reflect the mosque's columns, which become illuminated at night. The unique lighting system was designed by lighting architects Speirs and Major Associates to reflect the phases of the moon. Beautiful bluish gray clouds are projected in lights onto the external walls and get brighter and darker according to the phase of the moon.

The 96 columns in the main prayer hall are clad with marble and inlaid with mother of pearl, one of the few places where one can see this craftsmanship.

The 99 names (qualities or attributes) of God (Allah) are featured on the Qibla wall in traditional Kufic calligraphy, designed by the prominent UAE calligrapher — Mohammed Mandi Al Tamimi. The Qibla wall also features subtle fibre-optic lighting, which is integrated as part of the organic design.

In total, three calligraphy styles — Naskhi, Thuluth and Kufic — are used throughout the mosque and were drafted by Mohammed Mandi Al Tamimi of the UAE, Farouk Haddad of Syria and Mohammed Allam of Jordan.

Gallery

See also
 List of mosques in the United Arab Emirates
 List of cultural property of national significance in the United Arab Emirates
 Qasr Al Watan
 The Founder's Memorial
 Sultan Qaboos Grand Mosque
 Sheikh Zayed Mosque, Fujairah
 Zayed bin Sultan Al Nahyan's Mosque in Stockholm, Sweden
 Emir Abdelkader Mosque

References

External links

 The Official Sheikh Zayed Grand Mosque Center website
 The Official Abu Dhabi Tourism Authority website
 

2007 establishments in the United Arab Emirates
Mosques completed in 2007
21st-century mosques
Mosques in Abu Dhabi
Mosque buildings with domes
Tourist attractions in Abu Dhabi
Grand mosques